The Maine Savings Amphitheater (previously known as the Bangor Waterfront Pavilion, and Darling's Waterfront Pavilion) is an open-air amphitheater located within the Waterfront Park in Bangor, Maine. The venue is a temporary structure built alongside the Penobscot River. The venue typically operates from July until October.

It is home to the Waterfront Concert Series.

About
The amphitheater opened July 27, 2010, with a concert by Celtic Woman. Owned by the city of Bangor, the venue can house up to 15,000 spectators depending on configuration. In 2012, a proposal was submitted to the City Council to make the amphitheater a permanent venue. The council voted to keep the venue but declined its transition to a permanent stage. Renovation were made in 2013 to maintain the grounds, adhere to noise ordinances and expand the venue from 8,000 to 15,000.
 
A University of Maine study in 2013 showed that the economic impact of the Waterfront Concert series totaled more than $30 million since 2010.

External links
 Waterfront Concerts website

References

Music venues in Maine
Buildings and structures in Bangor, Maine
Tourist attractions in Bangor, Maine
Culture of Bangor, Maine